Music plays an important role on the FX television drama The Shield. Stylistically, the music ranged from hip hop (Master P) to mainstream pop (Duran Duran) to rock (Kid Rock) to country music (Johnny Cash), often within a single episode. Each continuing season had promotional music as well.

{| class="wikitable" style=text-align:center
|-
! Episode title
! Artist
! Song title
! Scene description
|-
| Pilot 
|- 
| Track 1
| Megatrax
| Ponle Cadera
| At the beginning of the chase, when Booty puts drugs inside the mouth row.
|-
|-
|Track 2
|Descarga Total
| Maraca
|Strike Team running through the store for Booty hiding his drug stash.
|- 
|-
|Track 3
|Moby
|Graciosa
|David Aceveda meeting with Terry Crowley at the park to put him undercover.
|-
|-
|Track 4
|Tha Mexakinz
|La Plaga
|Vic Mackey and Shane Vendrell visiting Miguel Esteana and making him lose the charges against them.
|-
|-
|Track 5
|Monster Magnet
|God Says No
|Vic meets Fred for information about the missing girl
|-
|-
|Track 6
|Los Lobos
|Maricela
|Vic visits Connie and forcefully requests Dmitris bankroll.
|-
|-
|Track 7
|Stevie Wonder
|Higher Ground
|While Vic is grilling at his house, Terry is talking with him.
|-
|-
|Track 8
|Stephen James Edwards
|Melisma Alleluia
|Aceveda, Dutch and Claudette rescuing the young child.
|-
|-
|Track 9
|Kid Rock
|Bawitdaba
|End montage.
|-
|-
|Track 10
|BZ
|Fantastic Planet
| Danny and Julien talking in the patrol car while driving in the deleted scene
|-
|-
| Our Gang
|-
| Track 1
|Cage
|A Crowd Killer
|Terry Crowleys condition announced outside of the hospital 
|
|-
| Track 2
| Mike Jimenez & Daniel Indart
| Dámelo
| Aceveda sees his colleague from the Department of Justice to talk about what went down with Terry Crowley.
|-
|-
| Track 3
| United States Air Force Reserve Pipe Band
| Amazing Grace
| At Terry Crowley's and 2Time's funeral monologue.
|-
| Track 4
| Bernie Marsden
| Highway 45
| In Vic's flashback with Terry in the clubhouse.
|-
| Track 5
| The Urbanites
| Rock Tha Spot
| Danny & Julien take Marlon Demeral for questioning.
|-
|-
| Track 6
| Bernie Marsden
| Like Lightnin Strikin
| Strike Team playing cards, Terry describing himself as Gene Simmons. (Mackey's flashback)
|-
|-
| Track 7
| Paul Lenart & Bill Novick
| Kansas City Feel
| Strike Team visit Van Bro on the street for information.
|-
|-
| Track 8
| Peyote Asesino
| Perkins
|  Gang association arresting scene.
|-
| Track 9
| India Arie
| Promises
| End montage of David Aceveda and Vic making eye contact.
|-
|-
| The Spread
|-
|Track 1
| Young Dre
| Dance With the Devil
| Strike Team busts into Virgil's apartment to find Derek Tripp.
|-
| Track 2
| Flight 180
| Sunday Jack
| Dutch & Claudette, with SWAT bust in a house and find their sperm collector.
|-
| Track 3
| Matt Anthony
| Pinched In
| Vic Mackey saves a baby from a crackhead.
|-
| Track 4
| Delinquent Habits
| Que Vuelva
| End montage.
|-
|-
|-
| Dawg Days
|-
| Track 1
| Out of Order featuring Lil John Show A Lil Mo
| Twerk That Thang
|-
|-
| Track 2
| Artifacts
| Wrong Side of da Tracks
| [Instrumental] Kern's girl announces something in the microphone.
|-
|-
| Track 3
| Copywrite
| Tower of Babble (feat. Smut Peddlers)
| In the club before the shooting and T-Bonz arriving.
|-
|-
| Track 4
| Tame One, Copywrite, J-Zone, Cage, Mr Eon & Skillz
| All Stars Air Max 95 Remix
| [Instrumental] The shooting starts in the shake club between Kern and his rival T-Bonz.
|-
|-
| Track 5
| Los Corales
| Ese Es Mi Amigo
| David Aceveda and his husband Aurora visit the politician rally to find new contacts.
|-
| Track 6
| Abby Dobson
| Deeply
| Vic and Lem visit Kern Little's music studio.
|-
|-
| Track 7
| SX-10
| Heart of a Rebel
| Vic and Lem arrive and investigate a street shootout.
|-
|-
| Track 8
| Los Pinguos
| Alegria
| Dutch and Claudette run after the migrant worker as he escapes through a small hole in the fence.
|-
|-
| Track 9
| Zamp Nicall
| The Streets of Iran
| As Danny Sofer exits the bar and is threatened at gunpoint by one of Rondell's guys.
|-
|-
| Blowback
|-
|Track 1 
| Seda Garibyan
| Hyots Aghunak
| At the beginning where Vic and Ronnie arrive to the apartment and place a wiretap.
|-
| Track 2
| 3rd Root
| Wah Wah
| Lem and Shane talk about Rondell's drugs.
|-
|-
| Track 3
| SX-10
| Caught Up In The System
| Strike Team preps for the bust in the club house.
|-
|-
| Track 4
| Haissmavourk Choir
| Yerg Votnlvai [1] (Hymn for the Washing of the Feet)
|  Margos guys snorting drugs before the take down.
|-
|-
| Track 5
| Trailer Park Casanovas
| Beer (feat. El Vez)
| Shane arrives at Amy's place.
|-
|-
| Track 6
| Push
| The Flute Song
| Vic and Shane meet officer Hoffman in the cafe for information about their missing SUV.
|-
|-
| Track 7
| Project 86
| Rebuttal
| Vic has a knife pointed at the guy in the store and asks him about their missing drugs.
|-
|-
| Track 8
| Jason Darling
| One By One
| Julien Lowe visits Tomas.
|-
|-
| Track 9
| Bernie Marsden
| Ballad of Joliet
| End of the episode where Dutch rolls by his car seeing Vic kiss Danny.
|-
|-
| Cherrypoppers
|-
| Track 1 
| Zamp Nicall
| Under the Midnight Sun
| Vic meets Connie on the street and asks about his case he is working on.
|-
|-
| Track 2
| Lee Jung-Hyun
| Crazy
| Strike Team visits Korea Town bar for suspects.
|-
|-
| Track 3
| Jim Blake 
| Forbidden Fruit
| Vic enters the sex club just before the stage curtains open.
|-
|-
| Track 4
| Mozart String Serenade No.13
| Eine Kleine Nachtmusik KV525 Second Movement
| Man in the mask is undressing underage Sun Lee.
|-
|-
| Track 5
| Gregg Montante 
| Night In The City
| Strike Team and the uniformed officers sweep the illegal sex club.
|-
|-
| Track 6
| Buckcherry
| Whiskey In the Morning
| Vic meets Kurt, the alleged cherry popper movie maker.
|-
|-
| Track 7
| Cardia
| Love Loss
|  Ending montage of Dutch sitting at Danny's porch and her inviting him to dinner.
|-
| Pay in pain
|-
| Track 1
| Los Pinguos
| Fumaza
| Beginning of the episode at the shooting range.
|-
|-
| Track 2
| Danny Wood
| Get Away
| Vic and Shane sit in the car, Shane finds the book about autism in from his car and making a racist joke about it.
|-
| Track 3
| Bernie Marsden
| Heartbreaker
| Julien Lowe asking Tomas if he even has a long-term plan to get his life together.
|-
|-
| Track 4
| La Maraca
| Arte Mixto
| Vic asks H'aime the description of the shooter.
|-
|-
| Track 5
| Stephen Edwards
| Montfort
| Dutch and Claudette at the sidekicks house asking her to come to the station.
|-
|-
| Track 6
| Dislocated Styles
| Fire in the Hole
| Vic talks to Suzanne Klassen outside of her front yard.
|-
|-
| Track 7
| Mariachi La Estrella
| Amor No Te Vayas Mariachi
| At the store when Vic asks Shane if SID check the blood pool.
|-
|-
| Track 8
| Gerard McMahon
| Sugar Fine
| Dutch going back to the sidekick asking for the message.
|-
|-
| Track 9
| Mogwai
| Take Me Somewhere Nice
| Ending scene with Julien and Tomas, when Vic abruptly breaks into the apartment.
|-
| Cupid and Psycho
|-
| Track 1 
| SX-10
| Erase Me
| One of Fran's boyfriends charges the other one, Julien & Danny arrive to scenery.
|- 
|-
|-
| Track 2
| Lootpack
| Laws of Physics
| Hooper can painted Fran's door, Julien & Danny try to make peace.
|-
|-
| Track 3
| Sam Black Church
| We Got the Youth
| Vic and Claudette visit the campus.
|-
|-
| Track 4
| The Soul Brothers Six 
| Where You Gonna Find Another Fool
| Danny gives Fran some advice about men.
|-
|-
| Track 5
| The Magnetic Fields
| All My Little Words
| End montage.
|-
| Throwaway
|-
| Track 1 
| Brujeria
| Cuiden a los Ninos
| Trucking is getting hijacked at the beginning.
|-
|-
| Track 2
| Kinto Sol
| Como Secundaria
| Vic Mackey meets with the tattoo artist for his sketch.
|-
|-
| Track 3
| Julieta Venegas
| Salvavídas
| Lem secures Tigre's place.
|-
|-
| Track 4
| Julieta Venegas
| Voluntad
| Lem at Tigre's place talking with her about his haircut.
|-
|-
| Track 5
| Cage9
| Nacionabisom
| Curtis Lemansky confronts Hector with punches.
|-
|-
| Track 6
| Conejo 
| Lets Ride
| Strike Team robs the evidence truck.
|-
|-
| Track 7
| Kinto Sol
| El Capitan
| Strike Team raiding Hector's house.
|-
|-
| Track 8
| Julieta Venegas
| Fe
| End montage, Lem cuddling with Tigre.
|-
| Dragonchasers
|-
| Track 1
| Zach Tempest
| Anthem
| Beginning montage in the strip club.
|-
|-
|-
| Track 2
| Goleta
| Satelitte
| Playing at the van, when Lem and Shane getting to listen Ronnie's wiretap.
| 
|-
|-
| Track 3
| Goleta
| Sing Along
| Shane getting a strip from Tulips, and suggestion from her to go outside.
|-
|-
| Track 4
| Erinn Williams aka Hunter
| I Am King
| Dutch talks to Shawn at his car mechanic garage.
|-
|-
| Track 5
| Mogwai 
| Helicon 1
| Connie recovering from her recent intoxication, escapes from Ronnie's watch.
|-
|-
| Track 6
| Hedder 
| Pull You Into Me
| Dutch sitting into his car at the end of the episode.
|-
| Carnivores
|-
| Track 1
| SX-10
| Punk Ass
| Shane and Ronnie go out on the streets for information of Rondell's drug competition.
|-
|-
|-
| Track 2
| Pagliacci & Mario Lanza
| Vesti La Guibba
| Acaveda enters the Maureen place for the first time after many years have passed.
|-
|-
| Track 3
| Lee Hee Hee (이가희)
| Mill (밀)
| Dutch and Claudette are at the store questioning the store owner and asking to give out the evidence.
|-
|-
| Track 4
| Daniel Indart
| Los Parranderos
| Julien chasing a kid with a gun at the birthday party.
|-
|-
| Track 5
| Goldo
| All I Really Want
| Dutch and Claudette with SWAT raid the apartment of home invasionist boys.
|-
|-
| Track 6
| The Royal Philharmonic
| Casta Diva
| David Acaveda visiting Maureen, hoping she will finally recant her story about the rape allegations.
|-
|-
| Track 7
| Luther Guitar Junior Johnson
| I'm Gone
| At the end of the episode, Dutch and Claudette being in the crime scene.
|-
| Two days of Blood
|-
| Track 1 
| Jesus Alejandro El Nino
| Como Te Gusta (Remix)
| In the beginning when the guys are drunk and elevated by their cocks fighting in the pit arena.
|-
|-
| Track 2
| DJ Curse, Soulstice
| Superfunk 2000
| Street corner drug deal goes very wrong.
|-
|-
| Track 3
| Henri Yonet
| Mystery
| Acaveda and Claudette question the witness woman about the grove murders.
|-
|-
| Track 4
| Delinquent Habits
| Freedom Band
| Vic interrupts gang hangout.
|-
|-
| Track 5
| Tony Cook
| Teeny Bopper
| Danny Sofer and Julien Lowe respond to Dukeys garage sale.
|-
|-
| Track 6
| Maraca
| Pa'Gozar Pilón
| Shane bird wins the first fight in the night.
|-
|-
| Track 7
| Steve Reynolds
| Even Now
| SWAT raids a apartment including Acaveda and Claudette.
|-
|-
| Track 8
| Xocoyotzin Herrera
| Esperanza
| Shane is inside cockfighting arena, his bird is losing out.
|-
|-
| Track 9
| Bobby Byrd
| On the Move
| Dukey gets arrested.
|-
|-
| Track 10
| Rumblefish
| Statistic(Roy Mayorga mix)
| Riot breaks out at the end of the episode.
|-
| Circles
|-
| Track 1 
| Project 86
| Spill Me
| Danny & Julien get ambushed, early in the episode.
|-
|-
| Track 2
| Conejo
| Planet Los Angeles
| Vic and Shane chase a alleged witness of the shooting to the alleyway.
|-
|-
| Track 3
| Transultra
| From Out
| Comes from the alleyway when Vic blasts through the fence and starts talking to the boy.
|-
|-
| Track 4
| Push
| Eddie's Thing - 1987
| Vic meets with Tio in the street.
|-
|-
| Track 5
| Transultra
| O'Chanko
| Vic and Shane approach the door where Sonny's junkie dad is living at.
|-
|-
| Track 6
| Ill Nino
| Nothing's Clear
| Acaveda and the whole department of the Barn chase the drive by shooters.
|-
|-
| Track 7
| Jaya the Cat
| Cultifornia
| Danny & Julien visit a woman who made an emergency call.
|-
|-
| Track 8
| Coldplay
| Trouble
| Ending montage with Vic having a mental breakdown.
|-
|}

{| class="wikitable"
|-
! Music supervisors
! Music editor
|-
| Season 1
|-
| P.J. Bloom, Ray Espinola Jr., Evyen Klean
| Zamp Nicall
|-
|-
|}

{| class="wikitable" style=text-align:center
|-
! Episode title
! Artist
! Song title
! Scene description
|-
| The Quick Fix
|-
| Track 1
| Whitehouse
| Quentan Que El
| Plays at the beginning of the episode, gang setting up the murder execution.
|-
|Track 2
| Donatella
| Under the Moon
| Vic breaks into the apartment on the information Gordie gave him about his wife.
|- 
|Track 3
| Dilated Peoples, Lootpack
| Long Awaited
| Vic brings Alvarez in the rival hood to sweat him for information.
|
|-
|Track 4
| Muffy
| Overthrown
| Passing car near Dannys apartment, when she is laying down and Vic putting his clothes on.
|-
|-
|Track 5
| Francisco Javier Gonzalez
| El Indio Y El Vaquero
| Strike Team arrives to Mexico.
|-
|-
|Track 6
| Richard Cottle
| Gypsy Fire
| Strike Team move in to bust Navarro near the restaurant.
|-
|-
|Track 7
| Julianne Richards
| Get To You
| Maya comes back home, Claudette runs to her.
|-
|-
|Track 8
| Kenny Wayne Shepherd
| Blue on Black
| Ending scene with Acaveda and Vic.
|-
|-
| Dead Soldiers
|-
| Track 1
| Kinto Sol
| No Muerdas la Mano
| Armadillo's gang hanging out and getting inked in the beginning of the episode.
|
|-
| Track 2
| Los Pinguos
| Mi Manera de Amarte
| Strike Team visits Armadillo's house in the early morning to ask about his whereabouts.
|-
|-
| Track 3
| Nawal Al Zoghbi
| Ghib An Aynaya
| Julien and Danny inspect the apartment where the woman complained the smell coming from.
|-
| Track 4
| Supervision
| Baby
| Danny Sofer confronts the armed man Zayed Al-Thani.
|-
| Track 5
| Whitehouse
| Cuentan Que El
| At the end.
|-
|-
| Partners
|-
|Track 1
| Tantric
| Breakdown
| Opening to the episode and credits running.
|-
| Track 2
| Jade Esteban Estrada
| Bella Morena
| Dutch talking at the crime scene where the guy found the amputated arm near the trashcan.
|-
| Track 3
| Zamp Nicall
| Fifty Second Street
| Dutch asks Marcy and Bob to come to the police station to give statements about the missing girl with amputated arm.
|-
| Track 4
| Gil Bernal
| Easyville - 1954
| Vic and Joe Clarke are talking in the cafe.
|-
|-
| Track 5
| Outlawz, Jayo Felony
| Rockin (feat. Jayo Felony)
| (Instrumental) When Vic and Joe Clarke arrive near apartment building and Fleetwood comes throwing cash at Clarke.
|-
|-
| Track 6
| Zamp Nicall
| Faces in The Crowd
| Claudette and Dutch visit Bob and Marcy again. They are about to drive out of the parking garage.
|-
|-
| Track 7
| Black Toast music
| Down With Me
| Vic and Joe Clarke catch Taylor Orrs on the street.
|-
|-
| Track 8
| Debemos Creer
| Bye Sami
| Vic visits his former partner Joe Clarks apartment. Joe rants about his lawsuit.
|-
|-
| Track 9
| F.Y.N.E
| Make Ya Head Pop Off
| Fleetwood sits into his car and drives off.
|-
|-
| Track 10
| Diana Lee
| My Man
| Shane forces a confession out of Fleetwoods girl.
|-
|-
| Track 11
| Michael Penn
| Whole Truth
| Shane walks in the hospital room. Visibly upset Dutch walks into washroom.
|-
|-

|-
| Carte Blanche
|-
| Track 1
| Geddin Ug'Lee
| Extreme
| Taylor Orrs is having his van sale near the curb of the street.
|-
|-
| Track 2
| Tresspasser
| Bad Medicine
| Vic wants information from the store owner who owned the jewels.
|-
|-
| Track 3
| The Rhythm Machine
| The Kick
| Vic and Shane catch the guy on the store who knocked off his Armenian partner.
|-
|-
| Track 4
| Narine Shahbazian
| Broyi Broyi
| Vic shows Alex Esnik the missing jewels in the bar lounge.
|-
|-
| Track 5
| John Fiddy, Helen Welch, Orchestra John Fiddy
| Everytime We Meet
| Vic takes a motel room at the end of the episode.
|-
|-
| Greenlit
|-
|Track 1 
| North Mississippi Allstars
| Drinking Muddy Water
| Strike Team clubhouse playing cards in the beginning.
|-
| Track 2
| Universal Production Music
| East Coast Strut
| Claudette is in the store questioning the storekeeper.
|-
|-
| Track 3
| Slim and The Soulful Saints
| Fish Head
| Dutch & Claudette are questioning witness about Earl.
|-
|-
| Track 4
| Santana
| Corazón Espinado (feat. Maná)
| Shane discussing money train with Lem and Vic and Ronnie in other car seeing Enrique walking to the spot. 
|-
|-
| Track 5
| Kinto Sol
| Que Risa Me Da
| Enrique gets busted undercover and Strike Team raids the house.
|-
|-
| Track 6
| Tha Mexakinz
| Phonkie Melodia
| Vic chokes Eduardo with a towel for Armadillos location.
|-
|-
| Track 7
| Whitehouse
| Cuentan Que El
| Coming from the house at the end of the episode.
|-
|-
| Homewrecker
|-
| Track 1 
| Campagnia D'Opera Italiane
| Medamina! (Don Giovanni)
| Coming from Gordies car stereo when talking to Vic.
|-
|-
| Track 2
| Babaloo
| Trabalengua
| Vic and Shane question the pimp.
|-
|-
| Track 3
| Ill Harmonics
| Take Two (Call Me In the Morning)
| Aceveda and Julien stop a kid on a bike and talk to him.
|-
|-
| Track 4
| Click Tha Supah Latin
| 4 My People
| Julien is in the duty with Aceveda, they recover the boys bike Aceveda accidentally stole.
|-
|-
| Track 5
| Dragbeat
| Pure Dirt
| Connie is taken hostage, Vic enters the apartment to negotiate.
|-
|-
| Track 6
| Radio Mundial
| Me Voy
| Aceveda and Julien return the bike to the rightful owner.
|-
|-
| Barnstormers
|-
| Track 1
| Daryl Hall & John Oates
| Rich Girl
| In the beginning, Lem keeps imitating/singing this song.
|-
|-
| Track 2
| Tree
| Subdued
| Coming from the apartment when Vic & Shane make a deal with Leith.
|-
| Track 3
| James Speer
| It Would Seem
| Dutch rips up the evidence bra for his case in the car.
|-
|-
| Track 4
| Road Kings
| Gunslinger
| In Shane's car stereo when he's going to meet Herk with Tulips.
|-
|-
| Track 5
| Pete Droge
| I Can't Help from Crying Sometime
| At the end, Vic finds Ronnie on his apartment kitchen floor.
|-
|-
| Scar Tissue
|-
| Track 1 
| Pete Droge
| I Can't Help from Crying Sometime
| Ronnie Gardocki being hauled away at the beginning on the stretcher.
|-
|-
| Track 2
| Stoic Frame
| Demonios
| Leashed dog attacks Shane at the backyard.
|-
|-
| Track 3
| V1RT7U4L
| Sin Oxigeno
| Strike Team breaks into another territory with one guy working on the truck and another one in the front.
|-
|-
| Track 4
| Las Quince Letras
| Sueno Purepecha
| Inside Armadillos building when he sees strike team block all his exit/entrances.
|-
|-
| Track 5
| Flogging Molly
| If I Ever Leave This World Alive
| End montage.
|-
| Co-Pilot
|-
| Track 1 
| Black Uhuru
| Justice
| Vic and Shane question Ringo.
|-
|-
| Track 2
| Grupo Imperio
| Quiero Ver
| Danny & Julien get breakfast from the food truck and notice a bloody female victim
|-
|-
| Track 3
| B Dastardly
| I-Witness
| Danny & Julien arrest Karlton Johnson.
|-
|-
| Track 4
| Roy Wootton
| I Do Like To Be Beside the Seaside
| Vic and Shane listening to the wiretap they put on Connie to be sure she is safe putting drugs under the sink. While camera shows the carousel.
|-
|-
| Track 5
| The Neckbones
| Gangstafied
| When Strike Team searches for drugs Connie planted under the sink and arrest the guy afterwards.
|-
|-
| Track 6
| Grupo Imperio
| Enamórate
| 
|-
|-
| Track 7
| Dave Anderson
| Cool Guitar Blues
| End of the episode with Terry Crowley end montage joining in with the Strike Team, Lem coming off from shower and Julien seeing his naked butt.
|-
|-
| Coyotes
|-
| Track 1
| Chucho Merchan
| Funba Rumba
| Some Latino women brawl on the street and Julien commands one of them to spit out the knife.
|-
|-
|-
| Track 2
| Simon Stokes
| Jungle Music
| Gilroy is in the bar drinking.
| 
|-
|-
| Track 3
| Mariachi La Estrella
| Dorado
| Plays very shortly from the coyotes van when he arrives to the drop off point with the migrants.
|-
|-
| Track 4
| Element
| Superkollider
| Claudette and Dutch search for Nancy in the dark building.
|-
|-
| Inferno
|-
| Track 1
| Fanny Grace 
| Fade Away
| Beginning of the episode, Julien chases a suspect into a clothing store.
|-
|-
|-
| Track 2
| Onyx
| Bring 'Em Out Dead
| Kern wants to bring Vic and his team into his drug game.
|-
|-
| Track 3
| Jasz
| Take It to Da Flo
| Tavon asks the manager if they could get inside Froggers apartment.
|-
|-
| Track 4
| Sam Sneed
| 2 Tha Floor
| Strike Team raids Froggers apartment, coming from stereo.
|-
|-
| Track 5
| Kelis
| Mafia
| Vic, Shane visit Kern for to tell they can't be part of his business and they still owe him for the tip for Dante Fell.
|-
|-
| Track 6
| Angela Johnson
| No Better Love
| Vic visits Kern again, admitting his mistake with earlier business model they had with Rondell.
|-
|-
| Track 7
| Map of Wyoming
| Hilltop
| In the end of the episode Corrine visits Vic about the lawyer he hired for the custody case.
|-
|-
| Breakpoint
|-
| Track 1 
| Orchestra Heinz Kiessling
| Martini Genie
| Julien visits Tomas in the cafe for the last time with his counselor.
|-
|-
| Track 2
| Unida
| Thorn
| Vic and Shane check up the sex store.
|-
|-
| Track 3
| Grahame McLean, Pat Lee, Stephan North
| Eensy Weensy Spider
| Corrine is bathing Meghan in the bathtub when Vic has to break into the house setting off the alarm.
|-
|-
| Track 4
| Michael Melvoin
| Sunflower
| Playing in the restaurant when Claudette chats up with Chief Bankston.
|-
|-
| Dominoes Falling
|-
| Track 1 
| Daniel Ash
| Trouble
| Vic and his team visit Radiohead.
|-
|-
| Track 2
| Grand Drive
| Firefly
| Ronnie enters Armenian money site with the garbage truck. Shane and Lem waiting inside preparing to go out.
|-
|-
| Track 3
| Littles, Big Noyd
| Ghetto Starzz (feat. Big Noyd)
| Tavon plays faked Russian roulette with the gun on the suspect.
|-
|-
| Track 4
| Cabula
| Poder de la Mujer
| Vic and Tavon at the fairy searching for the shooter.
|-
|-
| Track 5
| Nailah Porter
| The Scene
| Plays when Julien and her wife Vanessa doing chores.
|-
|-
| Track 6
| Live
| Overcome
| End montage of the episode.
|-
|-
|}

{| class="wikitable"
|-
! Music supervisors
! Music editor
|-
| Season 2
|-
| P.J. Bloom, Ray Espinola Jr., Evyen Klean
| Zamp Nicall
|-
|-
|}

{| class="wikitable" style=text-align:center
|-
! Episode title
! Artist
! Song title
! Scene description
|-
| Playing Tight
|-
| Track 1 
| Rupert Holmes
| Escape (The Piña Colada Song)
| At the beginning, Strike Team on the stakeout.
|-
|-
| Track 2
| Kameil Madison
| Rock Ya Body
| At Kern's club; Vic and Shane come to ask about the guns.
|-
|-
| Track 3
| Gargantua Soul
| Rat Pack
| Lem and Shane listen to the wiretap they left on Kern Little's, Lem notices a car passing by with music on.
|-
|-
| Track 4
| Spider Harrison
| Beautiful Day
| Vic meets up with his guys at the crime scene.
|-
|-
| Track 5
| Kings of Leon
| Holy Roller Novocaine
| Vic taking some of the money train cash at the end of the episode, Shane buying the Lexus for Mara.
|-
|-
| Blood and Water
|-
| Track 1 
| Bermudez Triangle
| Cu-Cu-Cumbia
| Vic and Shane meet Garza near fast food place.
|-
|-
| Track 2
| Paco
| Maria
| Julien Lowe and Tommy Hisk arrive to a fresh crime scene.
|-
|-
| Track 3
| Phaser
| Sway
| Shane having a talk with Mara about Vic and their relationship.
|-
|-
| Track 4
| Volovan
| No Quieres Venir
| Dutch and Claudette at the barber shop questioning the woman.
|-
|-
| Track 5
| Tattoo Ink
| La Quemazon
| Coming from Garzas drug lab.
|-
|-
| Track 6
| Willie Nelson
| Nothing I Can Do About It Now
| Strike Team at the bay, ending montage.
|-
|-
| Bottom Bitch
|-
| Track 1 
| St.John 
| Crack in the Street
| Hooker talks to Tavon, Strike Team is working their regular john's sting.
|-
|-
| Track 2
| Karry Walker
| Fillmore
| Tavon and Shane get solicitated by queen prostitute Cocoa.
|-
|-
| Track 3
| Dispatch
| Here We Go
| Tavon and Shane try to run down the metal door, before Coco tries to flush the drugs.
|-
|-
| Track 4
| Jonny Lang
| Long Time Coming
| Vic is talking to Farah at the end.
|-
|-
| Track 5
| Mudhoney
| Inside Job
| Shane is having a small engagement party in his place with Mara.
|-
|-
| Streaks and Tips
|-
| Track 1
| Chucho Merchan
| Ahead on Points
| A lady is spying from the curtains while strike team approaches Danny's apartment.
|-
|-
| Track 2
| Sam Black Church
| New God Science
| Deena arrives with the guy. Setup for the Strike Team to bust in.
|-
|-
| Track 3
| James Speer
| Already Gone
| Shane and Tavon are talking before the fight.
|-
|-
| Track 4
| Addison Groove Project
| Canopy
| Tavon hits the ground through the vans windshield with his head injury, passing car has this song on.
|-
|-
| Track 5
| Billy Squier
| The Stroke
| At the end, the Decoy Squad stripping because of the lost bet.
|-
|-
| Mum
|-
| Track 1
| Los Violadores
| 1, 2, Ultraviolento
| Strike Team arrives to the Alvarado Corridor to sweep speedracers gathering around all over the place.
|-
|-
| Track 2
| Spigga
| Papa Knows
| Vic forces a bong inside Juan Lozano's throat.
|-
|-
| Track 3
| Greencastle Homer, Terran Eve
| You and Me
| Claudette calms down Luanne who holds a gun in her hand.
|-
|-
| Posse Up
|-
| Track 1 
| Deltron 3030
| 3030
| Vic arrives near drug crib to investigate for a suspect.
|-
|-
| Track 2
| Honkeyball
| So Called Friends
| Julien and Vic arrest the guy who killed Tommy's family.
|-
|-
| Track 3
| The Vienna Chamber Ensemble, Wolfgang Amadeus Mozart
| Ave Verum
| At the house, Vic argues with Corrine about seeing Owen.
|-
|-
| Track 4
| Andy Stochansky
| Everest
| Vic tells the Strike Team the marked bills list is in Aceveda's safe.
|-
|-
| Safe
|-
| Track 1 
| Banda La Estrella
| El Chino y el Alacran (feat. Xocoyotzin Herrera)
| Strike Team take Otilio to questioning from the streets.
|-
|-
| Track 2
| John Eddie
| Place You Go
| At the end, David Aceveda goes to his cousin about his assault, coming from the garage.
|-
|-
| Cracking Ice
|-
| Track 1 
| The Sheila Divine
| Black River
| Vic and Lauren have sex early in episode.
|-
|-
| Track 2
| Joseph Charles, Stephen McIntosh
| Maybe Young
| Vic and Shane visit Desirae at the hair salon.
|-
|-
| Track 3
| James Speer
| Already Gone
| Danny and Dutch in the car noticing the practicing cuckhold mastrubating near the window.
|-
|-
| Track 4
| Baby Bash
| Feelin Me
| Playing in the background when Lil Syke and Trish begin to have sex while she is undercover.
|-
|-
| Track 5
| Phaser
| Sway
| Played during end montage while Shane gives Mara an engagement ring.
|-
|-
| Slipknot
|-
| Track 1 
| Dudley Perkins
| Washedbrainsyndrome
| Vic comes to Twizzy to offer him to give up the priest killer.
|-
|-
| Track 2
| Dudley Perkins
| Yo' Soul
| Vic takes Twizzy's guns from the table.
|-
|-
| Track 3
| Steve Earle
| Ashes to Ashes
| Plays during ending montage, the Decoy Squad clearing out of the Barn and Strike Team raiding Russians on the compound.
|-
|-
| What Power Is...
|-
| Track 1 
| M-16
| Sentimientos Rotos
|  Aceveda ON the watch of Juan Luzano in the beginning.
|-
|-
| Track 2
| Blue Mountain
| Riley and Spencer
| On Shane's car stereo just before Mara calls about her mom wanting more money.
|-
|-
| Strays
|-
| Track 1
| Los Reyes Del Bajo Mundo
| Y Por Que
| Trick escapes Strike Teams custody. A random car passes by aftermath with that song on.
|-
|-
| Track 2
| The Sheila Divine
| Dramatica
| Shane asks Mara to go to Vegas to get married.
|-
|-
| Track 3
| Jimmy & The Hillisbillys
| Anything
| Vic and Lauren snuggling in the bedroom.
|-
|-
| Riceburner
|-
| Track 1
| The Peasants
| Forty Lines
| Ronnie notices Shane's wedding ring, comes from clubhouse.
|-
|-
|-
| Track 2
| Ziroq
| Pobre Corazon
|  Dutch is questioning a witness with Claudette in a store.
|-
|-
| Track 3
| Opeat Got
| Belief (신념)
| Vic and Shane break into Tracy's illegal credit card theft operations room.
|-
|-
| Track 4
| Deux (듀스)
| Forever (힘들어)
| Strike Team goes through a store front before breaking into a video game room.
|-
|-
| Track 5
| Korean Folk Music Ensemble
| Shinawi
| Strike Team goes back to Tracy, Vic is about to arrest her but changes his mind.
|-
|-
| Track 6
| Kim Kwang Jin
| Solveig
| At the house when Vic catches Kim.
|-
|-
| Track 7
| Gordie Sampson
| Hangin' By a Wire
| Vic and Corrine talk about their custody time.
|-
|-
| Fire In The Hole
|-
| Track 1 
| Brown Eyez
| Woe
| Lem notes to Vic that they never should have taken the money, coming from nearby apartment complex.
|-
|-
| All In
|-
| Track 1
| Ween
| It's Gonna Be a Long Night
| Strike Team is shaking down a group on the street.
|-
|-
| Track 2
| Meliah Rage
| Barely Human
| Strike Team halts the half empty gas truck.
|-
|-
| Track 3
| Nune Yesayan
| Tamam Ashkharh
| Margos stabs Sosi, while strike team pinpoints his location in the building.
|-
|-
| On Tilt
|-
| Track 1
| Rokk
| Patience
| At the store, Danny and Julien talk with Robert Huggins.
|-
|-
| Track 2
| Harout Pamboukjian
| Te Atcheres
| Near the beginning, Strike Team busts into a house.
|-
|-
| Track 3
| Dwight Yoakam
| The Back of Your Hand
| Coming from Shane's car stereo when he leaves at the end of the episode.
|-
|-
|}

{| class="wikitable"
|-
! Music supervisors
! Music editor
|-
| Season 3
|-
| Ray Espinola Jr., Evyen Klean
| Zamp Nicall
|-
|-
|}

{| class="wikitable" style=text-align:center
|-
! Episode title
! Artist
! Song title
! Scene description
|-
| The Cure
|-
| Track 1 
| Jesus Alejandro El Nino
| Rebulu
| The beginning montage of serving the warrant.
|-
|-
| Track 2
| Jimmy and The Hillisbillys
| Lets Hillisbilly
| Officer Scooby struggles with the aggressive dog in the apartment.
|-
|-
| Track 3
| Master P
| Ooohhwee (feat. Markita)
| Captain Monica Rawling asks T-Gun to turn around at the cafe.
|-
|-
| Track 4
| Graham MacLean, Pat Lee, Stephan North
| Skip To My Lou
| Monica Rawling is comforting the found crying boy.
|-
|-
| Track 5
| Lars-Luis Linek
| Hope
| Vic beats up the father who beat his kid on the garage sting tape.
|-
|-
| Track 6
| Tech-I-La
| Tus Besos
| Was playing shortly when Vic was tackling the rape suspect of that child.
|-
|-
| Track 7
| Doctor Ross
| Good Thing Blues
| Vic and Shane are talking inside Dead Eye's house.
|-
|-
| Grave
|-
| Track 1 
| Mary Love
| More Love
| In the beginning, Army and Shane entering the sex shop.
|-
|-
| Track 2
| Christian Padovan, Stephane Huguenin, Yves Sanna
| The Other Day
| Shane talks to Army to pocket the drugs for by busts at sex shop.
|-
|-
| Track 3
| Funkhouse With Candy
| Tenderness
| Antwon Mitchell and some of his crew help to build the wreck center when Vic pays a visit about his case.
|-
|-
| Track 4
| Laurie Burgess
| Best in Me
| The boy runs into the store swallowing the drugs, while Strike Team follow him. Music comes from store.
|-
|-
| Track 5
| Dropkick Murphys
| Amazing Grace
| At the end of the funeral; Aceveda packing up his office and Rawling setting hers up.
|-
|-
| Bang
|-
| Track 1
| Mr Badwrench
| Gasoline
| Vic, Ronnie and Lem meet up in the bar to discuss Shane's shady dealings with Antwon.
|-
|-
| Track 2
| Mikal Raymo
| Lay Down
| Plays on the pornographic video for the TV set.
|-
|-
| Track 3
| PM The New Blues Revival
| Virginia-Highland Walk
| Vic, Shane and Army visit Terrence Ross in his video editing studio.
|-
|-
| Doghouse
|-
| Track 1 
| Dahlia
| Forget This Place
| Aceveda smoking in the bar lounge and chatting with high class escort Sara.
|-
|-
| Track 2
| Stoic Frame
| Otro Caido En El Callejon
| Vic & Ronnie chase the rapist to backyard.
|-
|-
| Track 3
| Dahlia 
| Live in Light
| David Aceveda meets Sara escort woman at her house.
|-
|-
| Track 4
| Grant Lee Buffalo
| Demon Called Deception
| End montage of Vic taking a huge look around at the Barn.
|-
|-
| Tar Baby
|-
| Track 1
| Duran Duran
| Hungry Like The Wolf
| Played in Dutch's car as he sings to it, unaware that he's being recorded for the sting project.
|-
|-
| Insurgents
|-
| Track 1
| Les Choeurs de L'Armée Rouge, Boris Alexandrov
| Katioucha (Катю́ша)
| Ronnie is talking with Vic about the recent wiretap on the russian cab in the club house, song emits from earphones.
|-
|-
| Hurts
|-
| Track 1 
| Vivian Ann Romero, Ernesto J.Bautista & Rodney Alejandro 
| The Shield Theme
| Julien and Danny stop a passing car, noticing the weed smell.
|-
|-
| Track 2
| And You Will Know Us By the Trail of Dead
| Will You Smile Again For Me
| Plays during end montage of Vic walking outside of rain and Shane trying to contact his CI.
|-
|-
| Cut Throat
|-
| Track 1 
| Alice In Chains
| Nutshell
| Played at the start of opening credits, while Vic is driving to meet Monica Rawling.
|-
|-
| String Theory
|-
| Track 1 
| Juan Del Castillo & Daniel Indart
| Somos Mexicanos
| Officers having a lunch in the beginning, including Danny, Julien with Scooby and Carl having a chat.
|-
|-
| Back In The Hole
|-
| Track 1 
| Jose Leon
| Quiero Bailar Contigo
| Lem pays a visit to Bettario at his house with Emolia Mendez seeing the drugs Lemansky takes with him.
|-
|-
| A Thousand Deaths
|-
| Track 1 
| Vivian Ann Romero, Ernesto J.Bautista & Rodney Alejandro
| The Shield Theme
| Vic & Shane stakeout the judge.
|-
|-
| Track 2
| Crazy Anglos
| Rushing In
| Guys come in to the carwash where Billings is and shoot the nearby driver.
|-
|-
| Track 3
| Santino
| Para Abajo Y Para Arriba
| Vic visits Gusano with the Strike Team and says to stay away from Emolia and her kid.
|-
|-
| Judas Priest
|-
| 
|-
|-
| Ain't That A Shame
|-
| Track 1
| Liza Carbe & Jean-Pierre Durand
| Yo Te Traigo Amor
| Strike Team is at Beneas store.
|-
|-
| Track 3
| Cheap Trick
| Ain't That a Shame
| Ending montage during the bar celebration and memorial, Monica Rawling drinking her beer at home.
|-
|-
| Track 4
| Roc Raida featuring Paradime
| The Shield Theme (X-Ecutioners Remix)
| Remix playing during Season 4 ending credits
|-
|-
|}

{| class="wikitable"
|-
! Music supervisors
! Music editor
|-
| Season 4
|-
| Ray Espinola Jr., Evyen Klean
| Zamp Nicall
|-
|-
|}

{| class="wikitable" style=text-align:center
|-
! Episode title
! Artist
! Song title
! Scene description
|-
| Extraction
|-
| Track 1 
| Livin Out Loud
| Come On Baby
| Strike Team talk to a store clerk.
|-
|-
| Track 2
| Coldplay
| Til Kingdom Come
| End montage.
|-
|-
| Enemy of Good
|-
| Track 1 
| Harry Hayward
| I'll Never Be Happy Again
| Coming from Vic's car stereo at the beginning of the episode.
|-
|-
| Track 2
| Barrio Latino
| No Quiero Tu Amor
| Emits from Emolias house when Vic is talking to her about Doomsday.
|-
|-
| Track 3
| Stoic Frame
| Sensacion De Placer
| Strike Team return back to Doomsday's house where they tied him up.
|-
|-
| Track 4
| The Marvels
| Hate Myself
| Coming from the apartment complex, when Julien and Tina try to control intoxicated men.
|-
|-
| Track 5
| Enzo & Su Clan
| Pa'l Salvador
| Strike Team arrest Doomsday at the diner.
|-
|-
| Jailbait
|-
| Track 1 
| Los Panchos
| La Mucura
| Julien & Tina arrive on the scenery to a big man laying on a woman.
|-
|-
| Tapa Boca
|-
|
|-
|-
| Trophy
|-
| Track 1 
| St. John
| Who You Leavin' Wit
| Strike Team entering the strip club.
|-
|-
| Track 2
| 22-20s
| Devil In Me
| Strike Team loading their weapons and preparing for the sting.
|-
|-
| Rap Payback
|-
| Track 1 
| Madison Smartt Bell & Wyn Cooper
| Anything Goes
| End montage of Kavanaugh watching down on the Strike Team from upper office.
|-
|-
| Man Inside
|-
| Track 1 
| Siop
| Glass House
| Coming from drug addict car stereo, when arriving to the wrong house.
|-
|-
| Kavanaugh
|-
| Track 1 
| Jane Fuller
| Gonna Cause Trouble
| Emits from the diner, when Jon Kavanaugh is talking to Emolia.
|-
|-
| Smoked
|-
| Track 1 
| The Hangmen
| Blue Light
| Coming from the Smitty's store, when Strike Team visits him about taking Lem's bail.
|-
|-
| Of Mice and Lem
|-
| Track 1 
| St. John
| Shake Ya Thang
| Lem is having send off at the strip club with Strike Team just before the plans change.
|-
|-
| Track 2
| The Roues Brothers
| Roadhouse USA
| Just before end montage song starts to play, there is a short scene of the bartender with that on the radio.
|-
|-
| Track 3
| The Smashing Pumpkins
| Disarm
| End montage.
|-
|-
| Post Partum
|-
| Track 1 
| Dirty Rig
| Two
| Lem can not stand the crying kid near the trailer park, he runs to help him.
|-
|-
| Track 2
| Marta Gomez
| Pececito de Agua
| Emits from the store when Strike Team visits Aldo at the shop.
|-
|-
| Track 3
| El Imperio
| Controversiales
| Strike Team raiding one of Guardo's stash houses.
|-
|-
|}

{| class="wikitable"
|-
! Music supervisors
! Music editor
|-
| Season 5
|-
| Ray Espinola Jr., Evyen Klean
| Zamp Nicall
|-
|-
|}

{| class="wikitable" style=text-align:center
|-
! Episode title
! Artist
! Song title
! Scene description
|-
| On The Jones
|-
| Track 1 
| Johnny Cash
| I Hung My Head
| Opening titles; Strike Team meets up and pays their final respects to Lem; End credits.
|-
|-
| Track 2
| The Robins 
| One Kiss
| Strike Team investigates an apartment, just the moment when Ronnie describes the guys drug addiction.
|-
|-
| Track 3
| Laurent Lombard
| Disco Pop Love
| It comes from porn mag store.
|-
|-
| Baptism By Fire
|-
| Track 1 
| El Imperio
| Nena
| Vic Mackey arriving near the gates of Santi's crib. 
|-
|-
| Track 2
| Raza Pesada
| El Maloso
| Vic requesting Rocha's location at Santi's crib.
|-
|-
| Back To One
|-
| Track 1
| Dirty Rig
| GTO
| Ronnie, Dutch and Billings raid a meth house and question the woman.
|-
|-
| Track 3
| Bobby Rivas
| Soy Guanaco Salvadoreno
| Shane is talking to Vic over the car, watching over the trash bin over the street to watch when Guardo arrives.
|-
|-
| Track 4
| Melingo, Luciano Supervielle, Marcelo Gamboa, Contra Las Cuerdas
| Miles De Pasajeros
| Vic Mackey is invading Guardo's hiding place.
|-
|-
| Track 5
| A Flock of Seagulls
| I Ran (So Far Away)
| Coming from Dutch's car stereo while going to his place with Tina Hanlon.
|-
|-
| The New Guy
|-
| Track 1 
| Ron Smooth
| Any Otha Day
| Vic and Hiatt talk to Moses on the street.
|-
|-
| Track 2
| TRU
| Drama
| Julien stopping the car with shooting victim laying on it.
|-
|-
| Haunts
|-
| Track 1 
| G-Stack
| Get It Done
| Vic approaches Moses to talk about Shanes beating.
|-
|-
| Track 2
| Dex Elliot Sanders
| Paralized
| Vic and Ronnie talk to Tilli at the yard.
|-
|-
| Track 3
| Drive-By Truckers
| 18 Wheels of Love
| Shane feeling guilt about Lem and snorting oxycotton in his car.
|-
|-
| Track 4
| Del Castillo
| Mi Carino
| Emits from the soccer field when Strike Team is making contact with Romero.
|-
|-
| Chasing Ghosts
|-
| Track 1 
| Dirty Rig
| GTO
| During the raid on Snell’s apartment.
|-
|-
| Exiled
|-
| Track 1 
| Rosita
| Mariachi La Estrella
| Strike Team entering the cafe, who Romero told to raid.
|-
|-
| The Math of Wrath
|-
| Track 1 
| Ghazaryan
| Adanayi Voghperke
| At the beginning of the episode, Diro doing some sewing work.
|-
|-
| Track 2
| Celldweller
| Own Little World
| Diro Kesakhian is listening to this from her headphones on the way to the bus.
|-
|-
| Track 3
| Luny Tunes, Noriega and Baby Ranks
| Motivate al Baile
| Playing in front of Santi's compound.
|-
|-
| Track 4
| Hillisbillys
| Got The Feeling
| Coming from Shane's car stereo when he is getting carjacked by the armed guys.
|-
|-
| Track 5
| Ritchie Lo
| Never Ending Dreams
| Corrine, Tina and Danny enter the shop that will be closed down to grab some Gucci bags.
|-
|-
| Recoil
|-
| Track 1 
| El Imperio featuring Shaeyla
| Basilamos
| Vic, Hiatt and Julien want Xavier for questioning.
|-
|-
| Track 2
| El Maloso
| Verde, Blanco y Rojo
| Vic convincing Santi to wait for another day of retribution for San Marcos murders.
|-
|-
| Track 3
| Jesus Alejandro El Nino
| A Comer
| Vic, Hiatt, Ronnie and Julien in the bar looking for the suspect.
|-
|-
| Track 4
| The Brand New Heavies
| Boogie
| Hiatt is having sex with Tina Hanlon, Dutch awkwardly gets setup for this by his partner detective Billings.
|-
|-
| Spanish Practices
|-
| Track 1 
| Donald Stuart Seigal
| Early Warning
| Passing car on the street has a radio on, while Vic was writing a note about the limousine he was following.
|-
|-
| Track 2
| Skripture
| Interview - Respek
| Emits from the gangbangers porch.
|-
|-
| Track 3
| Mariachi La Estrella
| No Te Rajes
| Coming from the street when Vic is about to arrest a boy who is about to initiate a shooting.
|-
|-
|}

{| class="wikitable"
|-
! Music supervisors
! Music editor
|-
| Season 6
|-
| Ray Espinola Jr., Evyen Klean
| Zamp Nicall
|-
|-
|}

{| class="wikitable" style=text-align:center
|-
! Episode title
! Artist
! Song title
! Scene description
|-
| Coefficient of Drag
|-
| Track 1
| Social Distortion
| Reach For the Sky
| Opening montage of Shane going into his apartment.
|-
|-
|-
| Track 2
| Enzo Villaparades
| Ritmo del Sol
| Shane finds the Zadofian apartment but hides from Vic and Ronnie.
|-
|-
| Track 3
| Tech-I-LA featuring Qbanito
| Adicted to You
| Outside the apartment, Shane hears two gunshots from Ronnie.
|-
|-
| Track 4
| The New Latin Faction
| Hija Cubana
| Radio playing at Pezuela's construction site; Vic talks about the blood lines at Kerney street.
|-
|-
| Track 5
| Stephane Huguenin, Yves Sanna
| Pretty Girls
| On the radio in the apartment where Corrine and her kids stay.
|-
|-
| Track 6
| The Dunes
| Sunflower Eyes
| Emits from Mara' and Shane apartment when Corrine comes to her at night.
|-
|-
| Track 7
| Standing Shadows
| Get Together
| Vic & Ronnie meeting Shane at the end of the episode discussing the bloodshed.
|-
|-
| Snitch
|-
| Track 1
| Magic featuring Suga Bear
| Ball Like Us
| Vic and Shane visit Moses at his crib.
|-
|-
| Track 2
| 504 Boyz, Master P
| Wanna Live Like Us
| [Instrumental] Strike Team enters the hair salon to make the arrest.
|-
|-
| Track 3
| Master P featuring Currensy
| Let Em Go
| Strike Team leaving from Spook Street, while the crowd going crazy.
|-
|-
| Money Shot
|-
| Track 1
| Paul & Price
| When The Pushing Starts
| Tina Hanlon undercover with at Devin's adult entertainment office.
|-
|-
| Genocide
|-
| Track 1
| Juan Zarate
| Aqui Estoy
| (Instrumental) Julien finds Rios location, Strike Team are heading to the house of his for the raid.
|-
|-
| Game Face
|-
| Track 1
| Master P
| Anything Goes
| Julien rushes in with Burnout to the big factory guns withdrawn.
|-
|-
| Track 2
| Quintaine Americana
| Something Went Wrong
| Dutch comes into Rita's apartment and confronts his son Lloyd about the assumption of his killings.
|-
|-
| Animal Control
|-
| Track 1
| Porcupine Tree
| My Ashes
| Shane talking to Mara in the end of the episode.
|-
|-
| Bitches Brew
|-
| Track 1
| ?
| ?
| Other rap song playing when Vic and Shane visit escort woman at her apartment.
|-
|-
|-
| Track 2
| Sean Coleman
| What Cha Gone Do
| Plays shortly when Julien and Ronnie pass by the apartment building while chasing Two Man.
|-
|-
| Track 3
| ?
| ?
| Another rap song playing shortly after Strike Team gets out of the car to chase Two Man.
|-
|-
| Track 4
| Shidee Thompson, Charlene Gilliam, Edgard Jaude & Rafael Torres
| Hoop Looters
| (Instrumental) Strike Team chases Two Man, Ronnie jumps him, Vic taking his money stack.
|-
|-
| Parricide
|-
| Track 1
| Drive-By Truckers
| A Blessing and a Curse
| Opening titles, Shane preparing his murder plan.
|-
|-
| Track 2
| TRU
| Point 'em Out
| Vic Mackey and police arrest Damon Leaks.
|-
|-
| Moving Day
|-
| Track 1
| Chucho Merchan
| Finger Snap
| Dutch visits Rita and trying gett into Loyd's past life as a teenager.
|-
|-
| Party Line
|-
| Track 1
| Michael Mazochi
| Tonight
| Ronnie and Vic visit Mara's mother in the middle of the night.
|-
|-
| Petty Cash
|-
| Track 1
| ?
| ?
| Song at the lounge when Vic visits Beltran.
|-
|-
| Possible Kill Screen
|-
| Track 1
| Los Lonely Boys
| My Way
| Shane getting into a fight in the apartment.
|-
|-
| Family Meeting
|-
| Track 1
| X 
| Los Angeles
| Opening credits; Vic driving to meet Ronnie.
|-
|-
| Track 2
| Robbie Nevil
| Livin The Dream
| At the store, Shane is buying flowers and pens.
|-
|-
| Track 3
| Los Rams De La Sierra
| En El Baile
| At the warehouse, Vic and Ronnie sneak up on Beltran and his protection crew.
|-
|-
| Track 4
| Concrete Blonde
| ...Long Time Ago
| End credits montage.
|-
|-
|}

{| class="wikitable"
|-
! Music supervisors
! Music editor
|-
| Season 7
|-
| Ray Espinola Jr., Evyen Klean
| Zamp Nicall
|-
|-
|}

Soundtrack compilation

As of 2012, one official soundtrack compilation had been released. The Shield: Music from the Streets was released in 2005, and contains selections from the first four seasons. Unofficial soundtracks on the Internet compiled by fans include tracks featured in episodes that were not included on the official soundtrack.

Track listing
 "The Shield Theme" – Vivian Ann Romero, Ernesto J. Bautista & Rodney Alejandro
 "Hating Hollywood" – Theory of a Deadman
 "Death March" – Black Label Society
 "Bring Em Out Dead" – Onyx
 "Lay Down" – Mikal Raymo
 "Perkins" – Peyote Asesino
 "Caught Up in the System" – SX-10
 "Freedom Band" – Delinquent Habits
 "Pride" – Damageplan
 "Nothing's Clear" – Ill Niño
 "Rushing In" – Crazy Anglos
 "No Muerdas La Mano" – Kinto Sol
 "Breakdown" – Tantric
 "Betrayal" – The Black Maria
 "Let's Ride" – Conejo
 "Ooohhhwee" – Master P
 "Mafia" – Kelis featuring Markita
 "Cuiden A Los Niños" – Brujeria
 "The Shield" (X-Ecutioners Remix) – The X-Ecutioners

Notes

External links
Music used in 'The Shield'

The Shield
Shield